Firat Cewerî (born 1959) is a Kurdish writer, translator and journalist. He was born in the town of Derik near Mardin in south-eastern Turkey. In the 1980s, he emigrated to Sweden, where he lives now.

He started writing in Kurdish in the 1980s. He served as the editor of the Kurdish journal Nûdem for about 10 years. He has written more than ten books in Kurdish and translated literary works of John Steinbeck, Chekhov, Dostoevsky, Astrid Lindgren, Yaşar Kemal and Henning Mankell into Kurdish.

Books
Mişk û Mirov - Translation of the novel: Of Mice and Men by  John Steinbeck, Nûdem Publishers, 126 pp., 1993.
Şevên Spî, Translation of the novel: White Nights by Fyodor Dostoevsky, Nûdem Publishers, 79 pp., 1993.
Çexov: Bexçeyê vîsne : piyeseke çar perde, Translation of the Play: The Cherry Orchard by Anton Chekhov, Nûdem Publishers, 92 pp., 1995. 
Gotinên Navdaran, Nûdem Publishers, 106 pp., 1995.
Girtî, Nûdem Publishers, 174 pp., 1996.
Kevoka Spî, Nûdem Publishers, 60 pp., 1996.
Kultur, Huner û Edebiyat, Nûdem Publishers, 423 pp., 1996.
Keça kurd zengê, Translation of a novel by Cemşid Bender, from Turkish,  Nûdem Publishers, 127 pp., 1997.
Dara hinarê : roman,  Translation of a novel by Yaşar Kemal, Nûdem Publishers, 117 pp., 1998.
Pêlên Derya Reş, Nûdem Publishers, 120 pp., 2000.
Emîl hê ji Lönnebergayê dijî, Translation of a novel by Astrid Lindgren (Emil i Lönneberga), Nûdem Publishers, 163 pp., 2000.
Sûmiyên Emîl yên nû, Translation of a novel by Astrid Lindgren (Nya hyss av Emil i Lönneberga), Nûdem Publishers, 155 pp., 2000.
Hingura êvarê, Translation of a novel by Henning Mankell (Skuggorna växer i skymningen), Nûdem Publishers, 191 pp., 2002.
Alfonsê sûm li ku ye?, Translation of a short story by Gunilla Bergström (Var är bus-Alfons?), Nûdem Publishers, 27 pp., .
Antolojiya çîrokên Kurd (Anthology of Kurdish stories), two volumes, Nûdem Publishers, 2003.
Payiza Dereng, Nûdem Publishers, 407 pp., 2005. 
Il matto, la Prostituta e lo Scrittore - Versione italiana (Calamaro Edizioni) 2022.

References
Biography of Kurdish Novelists (in Kurdish)
Nûdem Journal
List of Books written and translated by Firat Cewerî (in Swedish)

1959 births
Living people
Kurdish-language writers
Turkish emigrants to Sweden
Turkish Kurdish people
Kurdish journalists